Charles Bateman may refer to:

 Charles Bateman (architect) (1863–1947), English architect
 Charles Bateman (actor) (born 1930), American actor
 Charles Bateman (racing driver), British racing driver in 2008 Porsche Carrera Cup Great Britain
  (1922–2004), American jazz musician